Mansour Sarwari (born 30 March 1992) is an Afghan male kurash practitioner who also practiced judo and sambo. He has competed at the 2015 World Judo Championships and took part in the men's +100kg event.

He represented Afghanistan at the 2018 Asian Games and claimed a bronze medal in the men's +90kg event.

References 

1992 births
Living people
Afghan male martial artists
Afghan male judoka
Kurash practitioners at the 2018 Asian Games
Medalists at the 2018 Asian Games
Asian Games bronze medalists for Afghanistan
Asian Games medalists in kurash
Sambo practitioners at the 2018 Asian Games